{{DISPLAYTITLE:C10H16N2}}
The molecular formula C10H16N2 (molar mass: 164.25 g/mol, exact mass: 164.1313 u) may refer to:

 Color Developing Agent 1 (CD1)
 Metfendrazine
 Wurster's blue